Autoroute 70, or A-70, is a short Autoroute located in the Saguenay-Lac-Saint-Jean region of northern Quebec. It is the only Autoroute that does not connect to any other Autoroutes, although other Autoroutes have discontiguous segments (such as A-20 and A-30). A-70 was first created in 1983, and has since been extended three times.  

A-70 is only partially completed; it acts primarily as a bypass route around the urban area of Saguenay.

A-70 will be extended westward to Alma and eastward to La Baie. A new alignment has already been determined for the westernmost section of A-70.

History
The A-70 was designed to provide a limited-access highway link between Alma and La Baie. The autoroute has been built in increments since the early 1980s. It took nearly ten years for the first eight kilometers to be built. During the 1990s, highway planners modified the plans. Rather than building the western section of A-70 to parallel Route 170 between 8e Rang in Saint-Bruno (km 5) and St-Benedict Road (km 25), instead Route 170 was rebuilt as a four-lane divided highway. This interim rebuild was completed by 1999. Three years later, an additional 17 kilometres of new freeway in the central section were opened, connecting this rebuilt section of Route 170 with the original portion of A-70.

Future
Transports Québec has conducted a feasibility study for the western section while continuing to acquire property to provide a right of way.

Exit list

References

External links 

 Quebec highways 

70
Transport in Saguenay, Quebec